Luis Rodríguez de Viguri y Seoane (October 16, 1881 - December 12, 1945) was a Spanish politician and minister of National Economy during the Dámaso Berenguer period following the dictatorship of Primo de Rivera.

References

Economy and finance ministers of Spain
1881 births
1945 deaths